Mike Donilon (born ) is an American attorney and campaign consultant who serves as a Senior Advisor to U.S. President Joe Biden. He was the chief strategist of Joe Biden's 2020 presidential campaign. Prior, Donilon was working as a partner at AKPD Message and Media. Between 2009 and 2013, he served as Counselor to Vice President Biden in the Obama administration. Prior to his White House appointment, Donilon worked with the vice-presidential candidate to help him prepare for the debates and also as a traveling advisor. 

Donilon has been an advisor and consultant to President Biden since 1981. He has been described as Biden's "conscience, alter ego and shared brain" by the Washington Post.

Early life and education
Donilon is a graduate of La Salle Academy in Providence, Rhode Island. He earned a Bachelor of Arts and Juris Doctor from Georgetown University.

Career
Mike Donilon has advised candidates and worked on their campaigns in numerous important races including Douglas Wilder's historic campaign and election as Governor of Virginia (1989), Harris Wofford's upset victory over Dick Thornburgh to become Senator for the state of Pennsylvania, and Bill Clinton's successful run for the White House in 1992.

Donilon has also worked on campaigns for Governor Jon Corzine (D-New Jersey), Senator Bill Nelson (D-Florida), Senator Jack Reed (D-Rhode Island), Senator Sheldon Whitehouse (D-Rhode Island), Senator Joe Lieberman (I-Connecticut), Representative Dick Gephardt (D-Missouri), Senator Chris Dodd (D-Connecticut), Senator John Edwards (D-North Carolina), Vice President Al Gore (D-Tennessee), Senator John Kerry (D-Massachusetts), and former Senator Mark Dayton (D-Minnesota). In 2006 and 2008, Donilon claims he was "instrumental in the campaigns for Senator Claire McCaskill (D-Missouri), Senator Robert Menendez (D-New Jersey), Senator Mark Udall (D-Colorado), and Senator Jeanne Shaheen (D-New Hampshire), working to create the campaign ads for those races paid for by independent expenditure of the Democratic Senatorial Campaign Committee."

Donilon was a managing member of MCD Strategies, a media consulting firm, for which he received compensation of at least $4 million.

Biden administration
As his longtime advisor, Mike Donilon held significant influence over Joe Biden's successful 2020 campaign for president. He helped develop Biden's campaign strategy that had a three-pronged message: "that the election was about the 'soul of the nation'; that the threatened middle class was the 'backbone of the nation'; and that what was most needed was to 'unify the nation.' Only Biden could restore the nation's soul, repair its backbone, and unify it." "This is really about character and values as opposed to issues and ideology," said Mike Donilon, Biden's chief strategist, when speaking to the New York Times.

In November 2020, Donilon was named Senior Advisor to the President.

Personal life
Donilon's brothers are BlackRock Investment Institute chair Tom Donilon, who was chief of staff in former President Bill Clinton's State Department and is a former National security adviser to Barack Obama, and Terry Donilon, Communications Director for Cardinal Seán Patrick O'Malley of the Archdiocese of Boston. His sister-in-law is Catherine M. Russell.

Notes

References

External links

Mike Donilon's profile from the Biden-Harris Administration

Year of birth missing (living people)
Living people
American people of Irish descent
Biden administration personnel
Georgetown University Law Center alumni
La Salle Academy alumni
Obama administration personnel
Senior Advisors to the President of the United States